In physics, action is a scalar quantity describing how a physical system has changed over time. Action is significant because the equations of motion of the system can be derived through the principle of stationary action.

In the simple case of a single particle moving with a constant velocity (uniform linear motion), the action is the momentum of the particle times the distance it moves, added up along its path; equivalently, action is twice the particle's kinetic energy times the duration for which it has that amount of energy. For more complicated systems, all such quantities are combined.

More formally, action is a mathematical functional which takes the trajectory (also called path or history) of the system as its argument and has a real number as its result. Generally, the action takes different values for different paths. Action has dimensions of energy × time or momentum × length, and its SI unit is joule-second (like the Planck constant h).

Introduction 

Hamilton's principle states that the differential equations of motion for any physical system can be re-formulated as an equivalent integral equation.  Thus, there are two distinct approaches for formulating dynamical models.

It applies not only to the classical mechanics of a single particle, but also to classical fields such as the electromagnetic and gravitational fields. Hamilton's principle has also been extended to quantum mechanics and quantum field theory—in particular the path integral formulation of quantum mechanics makes use of the concept—where a physical system randomly follows one of the possible paths, with the phase of the probability amplitude for each path being determined by the action for the path.

Solution of differential equation 
Empirical laws are frequently expressed as differential equations, which describe how physical quantities such as position and momentum change continuously with time, space or a generalization thereof. Given the initial and boundary conditions for the situation, the "solution" to these empirical equations is one or more functions that describe the behavior of the system and are called equations of motion.

Minimization of action integral 
Action is a part of an alternative approach to finding such equations of motion. Classical mechanics postulates that the path actually followed by a physical system is that for which the action is minimized, or more generally, is stationary. In other words, the action satisfies a variational principle: the principle of stationary action (see also below). The action is defined by an integral, and the classical equations of motion of a system can be derived by minimizing the value of that integral.

This simple principle provides deep insights into physics, and is an important concept in modern theoretical physics.

History 

Action was defined in several now obsolete ways during the development of the concept.
 Gottfried Leibniz, Johann Bernoulli and Pierre Louis Maupertuis defined the action for light as the integral of its speed or inverse speed along its path length.
 Leonhard Euler (and, possibly, Leibniz) defined action for a material particle as the integral of the particle's speed along its path through space.
 Pierre Louis Maupertuis introduced several ad hoc and contradictory definitions of action within a single article, defining action as potential energy, as virtual kinetic energy, and as a hybrid that ensured conservation of momentum in collisions.

Mathematical definition 

Expressed in mathematical language, using the calculus of variations, the evolution of a physical system (i.e., how the system actually progresses from one state to another) corresponds to a stationary point (usually, a minimum) of the action.

Several different definitions of "the action" are in common use in physics. The action is usually an integral over time. However, when the action pertains to fields, it may be integrated over spatial variables as well. In some cases, the action is integrated along the path followed by the physical system.

The action is typically represented as an integral over time, taken along the path of the system between the initial time and the final time of the development of the system:

where the integrand L is called the Lagrangian. For the action integral to be well-defined, the trajectory has to be bounded in time and space.

Action has the dimensions of [energy] × [time], and its SI unit is joule-second, which is identical to the unit of angular momentum.

Action in classical physics 

In classical physics, the term "action" has a number of meanings.

Action (functional) 
Most commonly, the term is used for a functional  which takes a function of time and (for fields) space as input and returns a scalar. In classical mechanics, the input function is the evolution q(t) of the system between two times t1 and t2, where q represents the generalized coordinates. The action  is defined as the integral of the Lagrangian L for an input evolution between the two times:

According to Hamilton's principle, the true evolution qtrue(t) is an evolution for which the action  is stationary (a minimum, maximum, or a saddle point). This principle results in the equations of motion in Lagrangian mechanics.

Abbreviated action (functional)

The abbreviated action is also a functional. Here the input function is the path followed by the physical system without regard to its parameterization by time. For example, the path of a planetary orbit is an ellipse, and the path of a particle in a uniform gravitational field is a parabola; in both cases, the path does not depend on how fast the particle traverses the path. The abbreviated action  is defined as the integral of the generalized momenta along a path in the generalized coordinates:

Spelled out concretely, this is

According to Maupertuis' principle, the true path is a path for which the abbreviated action  is stationary.

Hamilton's principal function 

Hamilton's principal function  is obtained from the action functional  by fixing the initial time  and the initial endpoint  while allowing the upper time limit  and the second endpoint  to vary. The Hamilton's principal function satisfies the Hamilton–Jacobi equation, a formulation of classical mechanics. Due to a similarity with the Schrödinger equation, the Hamilton–Jacobi equation provides, arguably, the most direct link with quantum mechanics.

Hamilton's characteristic function 
When the total energy E is conserved, the Hamilton–Jacobi equation can be solved with the additive separation of variables:

where the time-independent function W(q1, q2, ..., qN) is called Hamilton's characteristic function. The physical significance of this function is understood by taking its total time derivative

This can be integrated to give

which is just the abbreviated action.

Other solutions of Hamilton–Jacobi equations 
The Hamilton–Jacobi equations are often solved by additive separability; in some cases, the individual terms of the solution, e.g., Sk(qk), are also called an "action".

Action of a generalized coordinate 
This is a single variable Jk in the action-angle coordinates, defined by integrating a single generalized momentum around a closed path in phase space, corresponding to rotating or oscillating motion:

The variable Jk is called the "action" of the generalized coordinate qk; the corresponding canonical variable conjugate to Jk is its "angle" wk, for reasons described more fully under action-angle coordinates.  The integration is only over a single variable qk and, therefore, unlike the integrated dot product in the abbreviated action integral above.  The Jk variable equals the change in Sk(qk) as qk is varied around the closed path.  For several physical systems of interest, Jk is either a constant or varies very slowly; hence, the variable Jk is often used in perturbation calculations and in determining adiabatic invariants.

Action for a Hamiltonian flow 
See tautological one-form.

Euler–Lagrange equations 

In Lagrangian mechanics, the requirement that the action integral be stationary under small perturbations is equivalent to a set of differential equations (called the Euler–Lagrange equations) that may be obtained using the calculus of variations.

The action principle

Classical fields 

The action principle can be extended to obtain the equations of motion for fields, such as the electromagnetic field or gravitational field.

The Einstein equation utilizes the Einstein–Hilbert action as constrained by a variational principle.

The trajectory (path in spacetime) of a body in a gravitational field can be found using the action principle. For a free falling body, this trajectory is a geodesic.

Conservation laws 

Implications of symmetries in a physical situation can be found with the action principle, together with the Euler–Lagrange equations, which are derived from the action principle. An example is Noether's theorem, which states that to every continuous symmetry in a physical situation there corresponds a conservation law (and conversely). This deep connection requires that the action principle be assumed.

Quantum mechanics and quantum field theory 

In quantum mechanics, the system does not follow a single path whose action is stationary, but the behavior of the system depends on all permitted paths and the value of their action. The action corresponding to the various paths is used to calculate the path integral, which gives the probability amplitudes of the various outcomes.

Although equivalent in classical mechanics with Newton's laws, the action principle is better suited for generalizations and plays an important role in modern physics. Indeed, this principle is one of the great generalizations in physical science. It is best understood within quantum mechanics, particularly in Richard Feynman's path integral formulation, where it arises out of destructive interference of quantum amplitudes.

Maxwell's equations can also be derived as conditions of stationary action.

Single relativistic particle 

When relativistic effects are significant, the action of a point particle of mass m travelling a world line C parametrized by the proper time  is

If instead, the particle is parametrized by the coordinate time t of the particle and the coordinate time ranges from t1 to t2, then the action becomes

where the Lagrangian is

Modern extensions 

The action principle can be generalized still further.  For example, the action need not be an integral, because nonlocal actions are possible.  The configuration space need not even be a functional space, given certain features such as noncommutative geometry.  However, a physical basis for these mathematical extensions remains to be established experimentally.

See also 

 Calculus of variations
 Functional derivative
 Functional integral
 Hamiltonian mechanics
 Lagrangian
 Lagrangian mechanics
 Measure (physics)
 Noether's theorem
 Path integral formulation
 Principle of least action
 Principle of maximum entropy
 Some actions:
 Nambu–Goto action
 Polyakov action
 Bagger–Lambert–Gustavsson action
 Einstein–Hilbert action

References

Sources and further reading 

For an annotated bibliography, see Edwin F. Taylor who lists, among other things, the following books
 The Cambridge Handbook of Physics Formulas, G. Woan, Cambridge University Press, 2010, .
 Cornelius Lanczos, The Variational Principles of Mechanics (Dover Publications, New York, 1986). . The reference most quoted by all those who explore this field.
 L. D. Landau and E. M. Lifshitz, Mechanics, Course of Theoretical Physics (Butterworth-Heinenann, 1976), 3rd ed., Vol. 1. . Begins with the principle of least action.
 Thomas A. Moore "Least-Action Principle" in Macmillan Encyclopedia of Physics (Simon & Schuster Macmillan, 1996), Volume 2, pages 840–842.
 Gerald Jay Sussman and Jack Wisdom, Structure and Interpretation of Classical Mechanics (MIT Press, 2001). Begins with the principle of least action, uses modern mathematical notation, and checks the clarity and consistency of procedures by programming them in computer language.
 Dare A. Wells, Lagrangian Dynamics, Schaum's Outline Series (McGraw-Hill, 1967) , A 350-page comprehensive "outline" of the subject.
 Robert Weinstock, Calculus of Variations, with Applications to Physics and Engineering (Dover Publications, 1974). .  An oldie but goodie, with the formalism carefully defined before use in physics and engineering.
 Wolfgang Yourgrau and Stanley Mandelstam, Variational Principles in Dynamics and Quantum Theory (Dover Publications, 1979). A nice treatment that does not avoid the philosophical implications of the theory and lauds the Feynman treatment of quantum mechanics that reduces to the principle of least action in the limit of large mass.
 Edwin F. Taylor's page

External links 
 Principle of least action interactive Interactive explanation/webpage

 
Lagrangian mechanics
Hamiltonian mechanics
Calculus of variations
Dynamics (mechanics)